Early Singles (which is the title listed on the record label's web site; also called Singles Box and Rational Youth) is a CD box with re-issues of Rational Youth's pre-Heredity singles and the eponymous EP. The box was released by Swedish label October Records in a limited edition of 600 copies.

The box contains the following CDs, in chronological order:

 "I Want To See The Light/Coboloid Race" (one bonus track)
 "Saturdays in Silesia" (one bonus track)
 "City Of Night"
 "In Your Eyes" (one bonus track)
 Rational Youth EP (one bonus track)

Track listing
All tracks by Tracy Howe & Bill Vorn except where noted.

Rational Youth:
"In Your Eyes" (Howe, Kevin Komoda) – 2:53
"Just A Sound In The Night" – 3:48
"Latin Lovers (Howe, Komoda) – 3:54
"Holiday In Bangkok" (Howe) – 5:28
"The Man In Grey" (Howe) – 3:24
"Holiday In Bangkok (live in Helsingborg 1998)" – 5:09 [bonus track]

"I Want To See The Light/Coboloid Race":
"Coboloid Race" – 5:18
"I Want To See The Light" – 3:42
"Coboloid Race (Bill Vorn remix)" – 6:12 [bonus track]

"City Of Night":
"City Of Night (danse mix)" – 7:09
"Powerzone" – 3:38
"Cité Phosphore" – 4:00

"Saturdays in Silesia":
"Saturdays in Silesia (extended version)" – 7:14
"Pile Ou Face" – 2:37
"Saturdays in Silesia (Dee Long remix)" – 4:05 [bonus track]

"In Your Eyes":
"In Your Eyes (extended)" (Howe, Komoda) – 5:24
"Hot Streets" (Duran, Howe, Komoda) – 3:04 [English version of "Pile Ou Face"]
"I've Got A Sister In The Navy" (Howe) – 3:50 [previously unreleased version, bonus track]

Personnel
 Tracy Howe – vocals, synthesizers
 Bill Vorn – synthesizers, vocoder, programming
 Mario Spezza – synthesizers
 Kevin Akira Komoda – keyboards
 Angel Calvo – drums, percussion
 Denis Duran – bass guitar
 Jean-Claude Cutz – synthesizer
 Dave Rout – synthesizer

References

Rational Youth albums
2000 compilation albums